Rebecca DiPietro (born April 14, 1979) is an American former model and WWE Diva, who is best known for her time as the backstage interviewer on WWE's ECW brand.

Career

Modeling
In 2001, DiPietro appeared in the pages of Playboy. She appeared again in 2004 as "Cyber Girl of the Week" for the first week of June, when WWE Divas Torrie Wilson and Sable were on the cover.  She has also appeared in the magazine  Maxim as well as Stuff, as a cover girl and model, won the USA title for Miss Hawaiian Tropics International Pageant in 2005, and won the Miss MET-Rx Model Search contest for 2008.

World Wrestling Entertainment
DiPietro was spotted in a video from the WWE, but she did not make Top Eight until the 2006 WWE Diva Search. On the July 31, 2006 edition of Raw she became the third contestant eliminated. Despite being eliminated from the contest, she was hired by WWE four days later.

After her hiring, she was assigned to developmental territory Deep South Wrestling for training. She made her Deep South debut on September 3, 2006 in a backstage segment with Matt Striker, and from there began appearing in more segments and bikini contests. In mid October 2006, DiPietro began making appearances at ECW brand house shows, and eventually became the brand's television "backstage interviewer" on the October 17 episode of ECW on Sci Fi. She also made a pay-per-view appearance at the November 2006 Cyber Sunday event, acting as a "Lumberjill" for the WWE Women's Championship match. On March 22, 2007, however, upon request, DiPietro was released from her World Wrestling Entertainment contract.

References

External links
 Tropic Beauty profile

1979 births
WWE Diva Search contestants
Living people
People from Rehoboth, Massachusetts
Miss Hawaiian Tropic delegates